The 2018 WNBA season is the 21st for the Washington Mystics of the Women's National Basketball Association which began on May 20, 2018. The Mystics qualified for the WNBA Playoffs and reached the WNBA Finals for the first time in franchise history.

The Mystics started the season strong with a 5–1 record in May.  Their only loss came to eventual league champions Seattle.  However, the team couldn't carry this momentum into June, where they went 5–5.  The Mystics lost 4 of their first 5 games in June, but turned it around in the second half of the month, winning 4 of their last 5. The up and down season continued into July, where they again went 5–5.  The Mystics finished the season just like the started it, strongly.  With a 7–1 August record, the team secured a first round playoff bye, and the third overall seed.  The Mystics won seven straight games before dropping their season finale against Minnesota.  Their final record of 22–12 tied a franchise best, previously set in 2010.

The Mystics hosted a second round playoff game against the Los Angeles Sparks and won 96–64.  This win saw them advance to the semifinals where they met the Atlanta Dream.  In the best of five series, the Mystics won the final two games to advance to the 2018 WNBA Finals against the Storm.  An injury to star Elena Delle Donne in the semifinals hampered her in the finals, and the Mystics were swept 0–3.

Transactions

WNBA Draft

Trades/Roster Changes

Roster

Game log

Preseason

|- style="background:#bbffbb;"
| 1
| May 6
| vs. Minnesota
| W 90–85
| Ruffin-Pratt (17)
| Peters (6)
| Tied (3)
| Wells Fargo Arena4,203
| 1–0
|- style="background:#bbffbb"
| 2
| May 12
| vs. Indiana
| W 91–56
| Tied (15)
| Hawkins (6)
| Currie (3)
| Acierno Arena (University of Delaware)3,323
| 2–0

Regular season 

|- style="background:#bbffbb"
| 1
| May 20
| Indiana
| W 82–75
| Toliver (16)
| Delle Donne (5)
| Delle Donne (7)
| Capital One Arena7,400
| 1–0
|- style="background:#bbffbb"
| 2
| May 22
| Las Vegas
| W 75–70
| Delle Donne (23)
| Delle Donne (11)
| Cloud (5)
| Capital One Arena4,509
| 2–0
|- style="background:#bbffbb"
| 3
| May 24
| @ Indiana
| W 93–84
| Delle Donne (26)
| Delle Donne (10)
| Tied (4)
| Bankers Life Fieldhouse4,415
| 3–0
|- style="background:#bbffbb"
| 4
| May 27
| Minnesota
| W 90–78
| Toliver (19)
| Hines–Allen (13)
| Cloud (8)
| Capital One Arena5,723
| 4–0
|- style="background:#fcc"
| 5
| May 29
| @ Seattle
| L 77–81
| Toliver (20)
| Hines–Allen (11)
| Ruffin-Pratt (5)
| KeyArena4,453
| 4–1
|- style="background:#bbffbb"
| 6
| May 30
| @ Phoenix
| W 103–95
| Toliver (30)
| Hawkins (12)
| Atkins (4)
| Talking Stick Resort Arena8,188
| 5–1

|- style="background:#fcc"
| 7
| June 1
| @ Las Vegas
| L 73–74
| Currie (24)
| Currie (8)
| Toliver (4)
| Mandalay Bay Events Center5,575
| 5–2
|- style="background:#fcc"
| 8
| June 3
| Connecticut
| L 64–88
| Atkins (14)
| Tied (4)
| Tied (3)
| Capital One Arena5,176
| 5–3
|- style="background:#fcc"
| 9
| June 7
| Minnesota
| L 80–88
| Cloud (17)
| Cloud (5)
| Cloud (9)
| Capital One Arena8,587
| 5–4
|- style="background:#bbffbb"
| 10
| June 13
| @ Connecticut
| W 95–91
| Delle Donne (36)
| Delle Donne (5)
| Toliver (4)
| Mohegan Sun Arena
| 6–4
|- style="background:#fcc"
| 11
| June 15
| Los Angeles
| L 86–97
| Delle Donne (18)
| Sanders (11)
| Toliver (8)
| Capital One Arena5,289
| 6–5
|- style="background:#bbffbb"
| 12
| June 19
| Chicago
| W 88–60
| Toliver (19)
| Delle Donne (7)
| Toliver (8)
| Capital One Arena4,206
| 7–5
|- style="background:#bbffbb"
| 13
| June 22
| @ Chicago
| W 93–77
| Delle Donne (30)
| Sanders (11)
| Delle Donne (6)
| Wintrust Arena5,831
| 8–5
|- style="background:#bbffbb"
| 14
| June 26
| Connecticut
| W 92–80
| Delle Donne (25)
| Sanders (8)
| Toliver (8)
| Capital One Arena4,139
| 9–5
|- style="background:#bbffbb"
| 15
| June 28
| New York
| W 80–77
| Delle Donne (22)
| Sanders (6)
| Tied (3)
| Capital One Arena4,473
| 10–5
|- style="background:#fcc"
| 16
| June 30
| Phoenix
| L 74–84
| Delle Donne (27)
| Delle Donne (13)
| Cloud (4)
| Capital One Arena6,218
| 10–6

|- style="background:#bbffbb"
| 17
| July 5
| New York
| W 86–67
| Delle Donne (21)
| Cloud (6)
| Cloud (10)
| Capital One Arena4,674
| 11–6
|- style="background:#bbffbb"
| 18
| July 7
| @ Los Angeles
| W 83–74
| Toliver (20)
| Sanders (8)
| Tied (3)
| Staples Center10,163
| 12–6
|- style="background:#fcc"
| 19
| July 8
| @ Seattle
| L 91–97
| Delle Donne (29)
| Delle Donne (7)
| Toliver (6)
| KeyArena8,724
| 12–7
|- style="background:#fcc"
| 20
| July 11
| Atlanta
| L 89–106
| Cloud (17)
| Delle Donne (9)
| Toliver (5)
| Capital One Arena11,354
| 12–8
|- style="background:#bbffbb"
| 21
| July 13
| Chicago
| W 88–72
| Tied (25)
| Sanders (8)
| Cloud (7)
| Capital One Arena5,858
| 13–8
|- style="background:#fcc"
| 22
| July 15
| @ Atlanta
| L 77–80
| Delle Donne (23)
| Delle Donne (11)
| Toliver (6)
| McCamish Pavilion3,880
| 13–9
|- style="background:#fcc"
| 23
| July 19
| @ Dallas
| L 81–90
| Sanders (25)
| Delle Donne (13)
| Toliver (9)
| College Park Center4,411
| 13–10
|- style="background:#bbffbb"
| 24
| July 21
| @ New York
| W 95–78
| Delle Donne (30)
| Delle Donne (10)
| Toliver (8)
| Westchester County Center2,005
| 14–10
|- style="background:#fcc"
| 25
| July 24
| @ Connecticut
| L 68–94
| Delle Donne (21)
| Sanders (6)
| Tied (4)
| Mohegan Sun Arena5,125
| 14–11
|-style="background:#bbffbb"
| 26
| July 31
| @ Atlanta
| W 86–71
| Delle Donne (28)
| Delle Donne (16)
| Toliver (4)
| McCamish Pavilion3,648
| 15–11

|- style="background:#bbffbb"
| 27
| August 3
| Las Vegas
| W via forfeit 
| –
| –
| –
| Capital One Arena0
| 16–11
|- style="background:#bbffbb"
| 28
| August 5
| @ Dallas
| W 76–74
| Toliver (16)
| Powers (6)
| Toliver (5)
| College Park Center5,623
| 17–11
|- style="background:#bbffbb"
| 29
| August 7
| @ Phoenix
| W 103–98
| Delle Donne (30)
| Sanders (5)
| Cloud (6)
| Talking Stick Resort Arena7,769
| 18–11
|- style="background:#bbffbb"
| 30
| August 9
| Seattle
| W 100–77
| Delle Donne (30)
| Sanders (12)
| Cloud (8)
| Capital One Arena6,808
| 19–11
|- style="background:#bbffbb"
| 31
| August 12
| Dallas
| W 93–80
| Atkins (26)
| Sanders (9)
| Toliver (7)
| Capital One Arena6,362
| 20–11
|- style="background:#bbffbb"
| 32
| August 15
| @ Indiana
| W 76–62
| Delle Donne (25)
| Sanders (13)
| Cloud (7)
| Bankers Life Fieldhouse7,636
| 21–11
|- style="background:#bbffbb"
| 33
| August 17
| Los Angeles
| W 69–67
| Delle Donne (16)
| Tied (10)
| Tied (5)
| Capital One Arena7,400
| 22–11
|- style="background:#fcc"
| 34
| August 19
| @ Minnesota
| L 83–88
| Toliver (17)
| Tied (5)
| Toliver (4)
| Target Center13,013
| 22–12

Playoffs

|- style="background:#bbffbb"
| 1
| August 23
| Los Angeles
| W 96–64
| Donne (19)
| Donne (12)
| Toliver (9)
| Charles Smith Center3,548
| 1–0

|- style="background:#bbffbb"
| 1
| August 26
| @ Atlanta
| W 87–84
| Delle Donne (32)
| Delle Donne (13)
| Toliver (6)
| McCamish Pavilion5,086
| 1–0
|- style="background:#fcc"
| 2
| August 28
| @ Atlanta
| L 75–78
| Delle Donne (27)
| Delle Donne (14)
| Tied (6)
| McCamish Pavilion3,813
| 1–1
|- style="background:#fcc"
| 3
| August 31
| Atlanta
| L 76–81
| Powers (18)
| Hawkins (9)
| Toliver (6)
| Charles Smith Center3,867
| 1–2
|- style="background:#bbffbb"
| 4
| September 2
| Atlanta
| W 97–76
| 4 Tied (12)
| Delle Donne (10)
| Toliver (7)
| Charles Smith Center3,722
| 2–2
|- style="background:#bbffbb"
| 5
| September 4
| @ Atlanta
| W 86–81
| Atkins (20)
| Delle Donne (11)
| Cloud (5)
| McCamish Pavilion4,435
| 3–2

|- style="background:#fcc"
| 1
| September 7
| @ Seattle
| L 76–89
| Atkins (23)
| Delle Donne, Hawkins (7)
| Cloud (5)
| KeyArena11,486
| 0–1
|- style="background:#fcc"
| 2
| September 9
| @ Seattle
| L 73–75
| Delle Donne (17)
| Sanders (5)
| Toliver (3)
| KeyArena14,212
| 0–2
|- style="background:#fcc"
| 3
| September 12
| Seattle
| L 82–98
| Delle Donne (23)
| Delle Donne (5)
| Toliver (5)
| EagleBank Arena9,164
| 0–3

Standings

Playoffs

Statistics

Regular season

Awards and honors

References

External links
The Official Site of the Washington Mystics

Washington Mystics seasons
Washington
Washington Mystics